Marjory Collins (1912–1985) was an American photojournalist. She is remembered for her coverage of the home front during World War II.

Personal life
Marjory Collins was born March 15, 1912, to Elizabeth Everts Paine and writer Frederick Lewis Collins in New York City, and grew up in nearby Scarsdale, Westchester County.

She died in 1985 at the age of 73.

Education 
She studied at Sweet Briar College and the University of Munich. In 1935, Collins moved to Greenwich Village, and over the next five years she studied photography informally with Ralph Steiner and attended Photo League events. In the 1980s she moved to San Francisco where she obtained an M.A. in American Studies at Antioch College West.

Career 
Her work as a documentary photographer was taken up by major agencies. As a result of a contribution for U.S. Camera and Travel about Hoboken, New Jersey, she was invited to work for the Foreign Service of the United States Office of War Information. She completed some 50 assignments there with stories about the American way of life and support for the war effort. In line with new emphasis on multiculturalism, she contributed to photographic coverage of African Americans as well as citizens of Czech, German, Italian and Jewish origin.

In 1944 Collins worked freelance for a construction company in Alaska before travelling to Africa and Europe on government and commercial assignments. Thereafter she worked mainly as an editor and a writer covering civil rights, the Vietnam War and women's movements. In the 1960s she edited American Journal of Public Health.  Collins was very active politically; a feminist, she founded the journal Prime Time (1971–76) "for the liberation of women in the prime of life." In 1977 Collins became an associate of the Women's Institute for Freedom of the Press.

Her work is included in the collection of the Museum of Fine Arts Houston.

Gallery

References

External links
Examples of Marjory Collins' work from The Library of Congress

 Papers of Marjory Collins Schlesinger Library, Radcliffe Institute, Harvard University.

1912 births
1985 deaths
American photojournalists
Antioch College alumni
20th-century American women writers
Journalists from New York City
American women non-fiction writers
20th-century American non-fiction writers
20th-century American women photographers
20th-century American photographers
People of the United States Office of War Information
Women photojournalists